Abbas Ullah Shikder ( – 18 January 2020) was a Bangladeshi producer, actor and politician. He was the owner of Ananda TV and Anandamela Chalachitro. He was involved with the politics of the Bangladesh Awami League.

Biography
Shikder was the producer of Beder Meye Josna. This film is the highest grossing Bangladeshi film. He also produced films like Moner Majhe Tumi, Molla Barir Bou and Ji Hujur. Symon Sadik and Sara Zerin made their acting career debut with Ji Hujur. Besides producing he acted in films too.

Shikder died on 18 January 2020 at the age of 65.

Selected filmography
 Beder Meye Josna
 Pagol Mon
 Moner Majhe Tumi
 Molla Barir Bou
 Ji Hujur

References

1950s births
Bangladeshi film producers
Bangladeshi male film actors
People from Dhaka
2020 deaths
Awami League politicians